The 1971 New York Giants season was the franchise's 47th season in the National Football League (NFL). The Giants had a 4–10 record for the season and finished in last place in the National Football Conference East Division.

The Giants selected Rocky Thompson in the 1971 NFL Draft, with the 18th overall pick. After a winless preseason, New York began the regular season with a 2–1 record before posting a 2–9 mark in its final eleven games. The team was affected by numerous injuries, including a thigh injury suffered by running back Ron Johnson, who had gained more than 1,000 rushing yards in 1970. The 1971 season was the last for quarterback Fran Tarkenton with the Giants; after he requested a trade, the Giants dealt him to the Minnesota Vikings in 1972 for three players and a pair of draft picks.

Roster

Schedule 

Note: Intra-division opponents are in bold text.

Standings

References 

1970s in the Bronx
New York Giants
New York Giants
New York Giants seasons